Yevgeny Timofeyevich Artyukhin (17 June 1949 – 12 July 2008) was a Soviet heavyweight Greco-Roman wrestler. He won a world title in 1983, as well as three bronze medals at the world and European championships in 1981–83. He missed the 1984 Summer Olympics due to their boycott by the Soviet Union. After retiring from senior competitions, he worked as a coach, bringing his son Sergei to an international level in Greco-Roman wrestling. He also continued competing in the masters category and won the Russian heavyweight title in 1995.

He also was a professional wrestler in 1989 when he was a member of the Red Bull Army stable with Russians wrestlers Salman Hashimikov, Victor Zangiev, and others. 

Artyukhin died during a training meetup in Adler, aged 59. Since 1993, a wrestling tournament has been held in Tambov in his honor. His other son Yevgeny Jr. became an ice hockey player.

References

1949 births
2008 deaths
Russian male sport wrestlers
Russian male professional wrestlers
Sportspeople from Tambov Oblast